Borys Miturski (born 20 June 1989 in Częstochowa, Poland) is a Polish speedway rider who is a member of Poland U-21 national team. He was fourth in 2007 Individual U-19 European Championship.

His father Krzysztof and uncle Michał was speedway rider also in 1980s.

Career details

World Championships 
 Individual U-21 World Championship
 2009 - Lost in Domestic Qualifications

European Championships 
 Individual European Championship
 2008 - 13th place in Semi-Final 2
 Individual U-19 European Championship
 2007 -  Częstochowa - 4th place (10 pts +2)
 2008 -  Stralsund - 14th place (3 pts)
 Team U-19 European Championship
 2008 -  Rawicz - 4th place (2 pts)

Domestic competitions 
 Individual Polish Championship
 2009 - 16th place in Quarter-Final 4
 Individual U-21 Polish Championship
 2008 -  Rybnik - 15th place (1 pt)
 Silver Helmet (U-21)
 2009 -  Częstochowa - 11th place (5 pts)
 Bronze Helmet (U-19)
 2008 -  Gdańsk - 11th place (5 pts)

See also 
 Poland national speedway team

References

External links 
 Włókniarz Częstochowa webside

1989 births
Living people
Polish speedway riders
Sportspeople from Częstochowa